Riskee and the Ridicule (sometimes stylised as Riskee & the Ridicule) is a British grime punk band from Kent, England.

Discography

Studio Albums
Dawn of the Dog (2014)
Blame Culture (2017)
Body Bag Your Scene (2019)

EP's and Compilations
 Contraband (2017)
 They Need Us To Believe (2018)
 Too Young To Be Blue (2021)

References

Grime music groups
British pop punk groups
English punk rock groups
Musical groups from Kent
Musical groups established in 2011
2011 establishments in England